Abdi İpekçi Street or Abdi İpekçi Avenue is one of the premier shopping streets of İstanbul, Turkey, located in the Şişli district. It runs along the Maçka and Teşvikiye neighborhoods, extending from Bayıldım Caddesi/Maçka Caddesi to Vali Konağı Caddesi in the Nişantaşı quarter, crossing Mim Kemal Öke Caddesi, Bronz Sokak, Atiye Sokak, Teşvikiye Bostanı Sokak, Eytam Caddesi, Altın Sokak and Profesör Doktor Feyzi Feyzioğlu Sokak on its length of around 700 m in generally northern direction.

During the last decade, the street in the prestigious neighborhood developed into a place hosting luxury retail shopping venues. With a monthly lease price of about $3500 m², it is currently the most expensive street for retail stores in Turkey. A variety of exclusive and expensive shops offering Turkish and international designer labels, restaurants of international cuisine and cafés are lined up on both sides of the street.

The street was renamed after Abdi İpekçi, the renowned journalist and the editor-in-chief of the major Turkish newspaper Milliyet. İpekçi was murdered on February 1, 1979, in his car in front of his apartment residence in this street by Mehmet Ali Ağca, who later became famous for his failed assassination attempt on Pope John Paul II. A memorial near the place, where he was murdered, was revealed in 2000.

Some of the many shops include:

 Hugo Boss
 Chanel
 Louis Vuitton
 Giorgio Armani
 Cartier
 Prada
 Hermès
 Gucci
 Ermenegildo Zegna
 Dior
 Tod's
 DKNY
 Escada
 Burberry
 Max Mara
 Salvatore Ferragamo
 Gianfranco Ferre

New Year celebration
Open-air New Year's Eve welcome in the decorated street is newly becoming traditional as an alternative to the celebration at the more crowded Taksim Square.

See also
 İstiklal Avenue
 Bağdat Avenue
 List of upscale shopping districts

References

Dış bağlantılar 
 Blacksheep Giyim

Streets in Istanbul
Shopping districts and streets in Turkey
Şişli
Street